Marte Olsbu Røiseland (born 7 December 1990) is a former Norwegian biathlete and 3 time Winter Olympic gold medalist. In addition, she won two Olympic silver medals and two bronze medals. Her world championships achievements include winning two gold medals and eleven relay victories. She won the overall Biathlon World Cup in 2022.

Personal life
Olsbu Røiseland was born on 7 December 1990. She is married to Sverre Olsbu Røiseland.

She resides in Froland, Norway.

Career
Olsbu Røiseland has competed in the Biathlon World Cup since the 2012–13 World Cup season and has represented Norway at several Biathlon World Championships. During the Biathlon World Championships 2016 in Oslo, she won a bronze medal in the mixed relay and raced the final leg when Norway won the gold in the relay. At the Biathlon World Championships 2020 in Antholz, she became the first biathlete to win seven medals at a World Championship with her five gold medals and two bronze medals.

At the 2018 Winter Olympics in Pyeongchang, she won two silver medals in 7.5 kilometres sprint, and in the mixed relay. She placed fourth in 10 kilometres pursuit and eighth in the 12.5 kilometres mass start, and fourth in the women's relay with the Norwegian team.

At the 2022 Beijing Winter Olympics, she won three gold and two bronze medals, becoming the second biathlete to win a medal in all four individual events at a single Olympics, matching fellow Norwegian great Ole Einar Bjørndalen.

In the season 2021-22, she won the  World Cup overall title. She also won the discipline title in sprint and pursuit.

In March 2023, Olsbu Røiseland announced her retirement from active biathlon career after the end of the season 2022–23.

Awards
She won the award  L'Équipe Champion of Champions in 2020. She is the first and only biathlete and the first and only Norwegian athlete to win the this award.

She was awarded the Holmenkollen Medal in 2022. She also received the Fearnley award in 2022.

Biathlete of the Year 2022 by Forum Nordicum, the organization of journalists covering winter sports

Biathlon results
All results are sourced from the International Biathlon Union.

Olympic Games
7 medals (3 gold, 2 silver, 2 bronze)

World Championships
17 medals (13 gold, 4 bronze)

*During Olympic seasons competitions are only held for those events not included in the Olympic program.
**The single mixed relay was added as an event in 2019.

World Cup

Individual victories
19 victories (8 Sp, 9 Pu, 2 MS)

References

External links

1990 births
Living people
Norwegian female biathletes
Biathlon World Championships medalists
Olympic biathletes of Norway
Biathletes at the 2018 Winter Olympics
Biathletes at the 2022 Winter Olympics
Olympic gold medalists for Norway
Olympic silver medalists for Norway
Olympic bronze medalists for Norway
Medalists at the 2018 Winter Olympics
Medalists at the 2022 Winter Olympics
Olympic medalists in biathlon
People from Arendal
People from Froland
Sportspeople from Agder
21st-century Norwegian women